Melisa Güneş (born 16 April 2001) is a Turkish weightlifter competing in the women's –45 kg division. She is a member of Ankaragücü in Ankara.

Major results
She won the silver in the Snatch event and the bronze medal in the Clean and jerk event, taking the bronze medal in the total at the 2021 European Weightlifting Championships held in Moscow, Russia.

References

2001 births
Living people
Sportspeople from Ankara
Turkish female weightlifters
European Weightlifting Championships medalists
21st-century Turkish women